Piero Zuffi (28 April 1919 – 2006)  was an Italian set designer and painter.

Born in Imola, Zuffi formed as a painter in  Latin America. After a few years settled in Paris, in 1952 he moved to Milan, where he started collaborating with the Piccolo Teatro as a set designer. In 1954 he made the sets and costumes for a representation of the Christoph Willibald Gluck's opera Alceste, starring Maria Callas, then starting a decade-long collaboration with La Scala. His sets were characterized by fixed structures, lack of curtain and changes in vision.  Also active in films, he wrote and directed a crime film in  1970, The Syndicate: A Death in the Family.

References

External links  
 

1919 births
2006 deaths
Set designers
20th-century Italian painters
20th-century Italian male artists
Italian male painters
21st-century Italian painters
21st-century Italian male artists
People from Imola
2006 suicides
Italian expatriates in France
Suicides in Italy